Martin Schmeding (born 1975) is a German church musician, concert organist and academic teacher, who has made recordings of the complete organ works by composers such as Brahms, Mendelssohn, Franz Schmidt, Max Reger and Tilo Medek.

Career 
Born in Minden, Schmeding studied church music, music pedagogic, recorder, organ, conducting, harpsichord and music theory at the Musikhochschule Hannover, at the Sweelinck Conservatory in Amsterdam and the Robert Schumann Hochschule in Düsseldorf. In 1999 he succeeded Oskar Gottlieb Blarr as cantor and organist at the Neanderkirche in Düsseldorf. From 2002 to 2004, he was the Kreuzorganist at the Kreuzkirche in Dresden. In 2004 he was appointed professor at the Hochschule für Musik Freiburg, where he has been president of the institute for church music from 2012. From 2015 he has also been a professor of organ at the Hochschule für Musik und Theater Leipzig.

Schmeding recorded, among others, the complete organ works by Johannes Brahms, Felix Mendelssohn, Franz Schmidt and Max Reger. The recording was selected as "recording of the month" (October) by MusicWeb International.

Awards 
Schmeding was awarded prizes at organ competitions including the Mendelssohn competition in Berlin, the Pachelbel competition in Nürnberg, the Ritter competition in Magdeburg, the Böhm competition in Lüneburg, competitions at the academies of Hannover and Mannheim, the Deutscher Musikwettbewerb in Berlin, the European competition for young organists in Ljubljana and the Musica Antiqua Bruges. In 1999 he was a finalist of the ARD International Music Competition in Munich. In 2009 he received a prize of the Preis der deutschen Schallplattenkritik for his recording of the organ works by Tilo Medek on the label Cybele. In 2010 he was named "instrumentalist of the year" by Echo Klassik for his recording of an organ version of Bach's Goldberg Variations.

References

External links 
 

German classical organists
German male organists
German recorder players
Academic staff of the Hochschule für Musik Freiburg
1975 births
Living people
People from Minden
Hochschule für Musik, Theater und Medien Hannover alumni
Conservatorium van Amsterdam alumni
Robert Schumann Hochschule alumni
21st-century organists
21st-century German male musicians
Male classical organists
21st-century flautists